The Knife That Killed Me is a 2014 British drama film that was funded as a Kickstarter project. The story about a teenage boy who becomes involved in knife crime was adapted from the novel by Anthony McGowan. It was filmed in York, North Yorkshire in a purpose-built green screen stage at GSP Studios (at the former ARTTS International film school) at Bubwith, entirely on green screens. Production began in mid-February 2012 and filming began in mid-April. The film was released on 24 October 2014.

A casting call for the role of Paul was posted on 26 October 2011 and another for 'Yorkshire-based teenagers' was posted on 9 January 2012; the latter also states that Jeremy Zimmerman was the casting director.

Cast 
 Jack McMullen as Paul Varderman, the protagonist of the film and from whose memories it is created
 Reece Dinsdale as Paul's Dad
 Haruka Abe as Serena
 Andrew Ellis as Bates
 Richard Crehan as Kirk
 Alfie Stewart as Stevie
 Rosie Goddard as Maddy
 Grace Meurisse Francis as Freak
 Andrew Dunn as Mr Boyle
 Katherine Dow Blyton as Mrs Botharm
 Jamie Shelton as Roth, Paul's friend, the school bully, and the catalyst for conflict
 Reece Douglas as Mickey
 Thomas Teago as Compson and Goddo Gang Member
 Carl Anscombe as Goddo Gang Member
 Oliver Lee as Shane
 Sarah Baxendale as Shane's Mum
Natalie Gavin as Marlene
 Charles Mnene as Goddo
 Josh Brown as Billy
 Josh Benson as Kevin
 Andrina Carroll as Mrs Eel
 Kerron Darby as Miller
 Sarah Poyzer as Paul's Mum
 Millie Romer as Kirsty
 Tom Collins as Tariq
 Coco Hoyle-Ansett
 Lewis Greenwood as Freak

Soundtrack

The soundtrack was composed by Tom Adams

Reception
The film received mixed reviews. Wendy Ide of The Times described it as "an experimental British drama... with a densely intensive visual verve." Leslie Felperin of The Guardian praised the film's stylized look 

The film will also experience its Italian debut in the specialist youth selection of the Rome Film Festival.

See also

 2014 in film
 List of British films of 2014

References

External links 

2014 films
2014 drama films
British drama films
2010s English-language films
2010s British films